Talang Sverige 2014 was the sixth season of Talang Sverige (previously named Talang), the Swedish version of Got Talent, as well as the show's first season under the name "Talang Sverige". It was broadcast between February 24, 2014 and May 18, 2014. It was the first season aired on TV3. June 19, 2013, following a two-year hiatus, TV3 announced that they had acquired the rights for the show and would broadcast the show in 2014. The show took place in larger arenas than previous seasons, allowing things like motor vehicles and bigger animals on the stage. Joik singer Jon Henrik Fjällgren was declared winner and walked away with 1 million SEK.

Tour
The audition tour was held in November 2013.
 November 6–7 – Ericsson Globe, Stockholm
 November 14–15 – Läkerol Arena, Gävle
 November 21–22 – Stadium Arena, Norrköping
 November 26–27 – Helsingborg Arena, Helsingborg

Semi-finalists

Semi-finals

Semi-final 1

Semi-final 2

Semi-final 3

 First Live Show Featured No Buzzers
 Tobbe Blom Replaced Carolina Gynning For This Semi-final
 Gaston Got The Wildcard

Final

References

External links
Official website for Talang Sverige

Talang (Swedish TV series)
2014 Swedish television seasons